Gerhardus "Gerhard" Bernardus Josephus Westermann (25 December 1880, Leeuwarden – 3 February 1971, Amsterdam) was a Dutch artist. In 1932 he won a bronze medal in the art competitions of the Olympic Games for his "Horseman". Westermann's work was included in the 1939 exhibition and sale Onze Kunst van Heden (Our Art of Today) at the Rijksmuseum in Amsterdam.

References

 
 
 
 

1880 births
1971 deaths
Olympic bronze medalists in art competitions
People from Leeuwarden
20th-century Dutch painters
Dutch male painters
Medalists at the 1932 Summer Olympics
Olympic competitors in art competitions
20th-century Dutch male artists